Pleuville is a commune in the Charente department in southwestern France.

Population

Landmarks
The village includes the Château de Pleuville and the Château de Gorce.

See also
Communes of the Charente department

References

Communes of Charente